The 1980–81 FA Cup was the 100th season of the world's oldest football knockout competition, The Football Association Challenge Cup, or FA Cup for short. The final saw Tottenham Hotspur defeat Manchester City in the first Wembley replay. The final saw a memorable solo goal from Ricky Villa that was voted the greatest goal scored at Wembley.

First round proper

Teams from the Football League Third and Fourth Division entered in this round plus Altrincham, Dagenham, Mossley and Scarborough were given byes. The first round of games were played on 22 November 1980. Replays were played mainly on 25 and 26 November, with a couple of games on 1 December.

Second round proper

The second round of games were intended to be played on 13 December 1980. Replays took place over 16–17 December with second replays needed in two cases.

Third round proper

Teams from the Football League First and Second Division entered in this round. The third round of games in the FA Cup were played on 3 January 1981. Replays took place over 6–7 January with second replays needed in two cases – one of those second replays resulted in the elimination of holders West Ham United by Wrexham.

Fourth round proper

The fourth round of games were mainly played on 24 January 1981. Replays were played on 27 and 28 January. *(Played at White Hart Lane)

Fifth round proper

The fifth set of games were all played on 14 February 1981. Two replays were played on 17 and 18 February.

Sixth round proper

The sixth round of FA Cup games were played on 7 March 1981. There were three replays, taken place over 10–11 March.

Semi-finals
The matches were both played on 11 April 1981, with a replay on 15 April. Tottenham and Manchester City reached the Final.

Referee:- Pat Partridge (Co. Durham)

Referee:- Clive Thomas (Porthcawl)

Replay
Referee:- George Courtney (Spennymoor)

Final

The final was held at Wembley Stadium on 9 May 1981. The replay was held on 14 May 1981.

Replay

TV coverage
The right to show FA Cup games were, as with Football League matches, shared between the BBC and ITV network. All games were shown in a highlights format, except the Final, which was shown live both on BBC1 & ITV. The BBC football highlights programme Match of the Day would show up to three games and the various ITV regional network stations would cover up to one game and show highlights from other games covered elsewhere on the ITV network. For the first time the BBC showed highlights of a single game from the first and second rounds after highlights of League games. ITV did not show any games from Round One or Two. Occasional highlights of replays would be shown on either the BBC or ITV.

This season ITV were showing highlights on their regional highlights programmes on Saturday nights and BBC1 were showing highlights on Match Of The Day on Sunday afternoons in the second season of the 4 year alternation deal.

First round BBC Harlow Town v Charlton Athletic 

Second round BBC Colchester United v Yeovil 

Third round BBC Ipswich Town v Aston Villa, Everton v Arsenal, Swansea City v Middlesbrough, Brighton & Hove Albion v Manchester United (Midweek replay) ITV Manchester City v Crystal Palace (Granada), Queens Park Rangers v Tottenham Hotspur (LWT), Norwich City v Cambridge United (Anglia), Leeds United v Coventry City (Yorkshire), Stoke City v Wolverhampton Wanderers (ATV), Newcastle United v Sheffield Wednesday (Tyne-Tees) 

Fourth round BBC Nottingham Forest v Manchester United, Manchester City v Norwich City, Watford v Wolverhampton Wanderers ITV Everton v Liverpool (Granada), Barnsley v Enfield (Yorkshire & LWT), Middlesbrough v West Bromwich Albion (Tyne-Tees), Shrewsbury Town v Ipswich Town (ATV & Anglia), Exeter City v Leicester City (Midweek replay All regions) 

Fifth round BBC Tottenham Hotspur v Coventry City, Peterborough United v Manchester City, Wolverhampton Wanderers v Wrexham, Exeter City v Newcastle United (Midweek replay) ITV Southampton v Everton (Southern & LWT), Middlesbrough v Barnsley (Tyne-Tees & Yorkshire), Ipswich Town v Charlton Athletic (Anglia), Nottingham Forest v Bristol City (ATV & HTV) 

Sixth round BBC Everton v Manchester City, Middlesbrough v Wolverhampton Wanderers ITV Nottingham Forest v Ipswich Town (ATV & Anglia), Tottenham Hotspur v Exeter City (LWT) All regions showed these two games Ipswich Town v Nottingham Forest (Midweek replay all regions), Wolverhampton Wanderers v Middlesbrough (Midweek replay all regions) 

Semi-finals BBC Ipswich Town v Manchester City, Tottenham Hotspur v Wolverhampton Wanderers (Midweek replay) ITV Tottenham Hotspur v Wolverhampton Wanderers (All Regions)
 
Final Manchester City v Tottenham Hotspur Both BBC & ITV showed both games live.

References

External links
The FA Cup at TheFA.com
FA Cup at BBC.co.uk
FA Cup news at Reuters.co.uk

 
FA Cup seasons
Fa Cup, 1980-81
1980–81 domestic association football cups